Bajo el Alma is a Mexican telenovela produced by Azteca. It stars Matias Novoa and Barbara de Regil as the protagonists.

Cast
 Matías Novoa
 Bárbara del Regil
 Ari Telch
 Juan Manuel Bernal
 Roberto Sosa
 Alma Delfina
 Claudia Lobo
 Sergio Bonilla
 Lia Ferré
 Emilio Guerrero
 Pía Wattson
 Yair Prado
 Denise Marion
 Amanda Araiz
 Socorro Miranda
 Paulette Hernández
 Gabriela Barajas
 Ivonne Zurita
 Diana Lein
 Jorge León
 María Alejandra Molina

References

2011 telenovelas
2011 Mexican television series debuts
2011 Mexican television series endings
Mexican telenovelas
TV Azteca telenovelas
Spanish-language telenovelas